Stephanie "Steph" Kershaw (born 19 April 1995) is a field hockey player from Australia.

Personal life
Kershaw was born in Townsville, Queensland. She plays hockey for her home state in the Australian Hockey League, as part of the Queensland Scorchers team.

Career

Senior national team
Kershaw made her senior international debut in a test series against Korea in September 2015. Following her debut in September, Kershaw was part of the Australian team that won the 2015 Oceania Cup in October.

In 2018, Kershaw was named in the Hockeyroos team to compete at the 2018 Commonwealth Games. The team finished second, winning a silver medal after losing to New Zealand 4–1 in the final. Kershaw was also a member of the Australian team at the 2018 World Cup, where the team finished in fourth place.

Again in 2018, Kershaw also represented Australia at the Sompo Cup in Japan, and the Champions Trophy in China.

Kershaw qualified for the Tokyo 2020 Olympics. She was part of the Hockeyroos Olympics squad. The Hockeyroos lost 1-0 to India in the quarterfinals and therefore were not in medal contention.

International goals

References

External links
 
 
 

1995 births
Living people
Australian female field hockey players
Sportspeople from Townsville
Commonwealth Games medallists in field hockey
Commonwealth Games silver medallists for Australia
Female field hockey forwards
Field hockey players at the 2018 Commonwealth Games
Field hockey players at the 2020 Summer Olympics
Field hockey players at the 2022 Commonwealth Games
Olympic field hockey players of Australia
20th-century Australian women
21st-century Australian women
Sportswomen from Queensland
Medallists at the 2018 Commonwealth Games
Medallists at the 2022 Commonwealth Games